The 1985 Atlanta mayoral election took place on October 8, 1985. Incumbent Mayor Andrew Young easily won a second term against token opposition.

Candidates
 J.K. Ramey, tire store owner
 Marvin Yizar, private investigator and Methodist minister
 Andrew Young, incumbent Mayor

Campaign
During Young's first term, he was credited with uniting his natural constituency of black voters and the Atlanta white business establishment.  Accomplishments touted by Mayor Young included bringing new businesses to Atlanta and a plan to revive Underground Atlanta. Points of contention discussed by opponents included approval of the Presidential Parkway and his overseas traveling to promote Atlanta.  Nevertheless, economic prosperity and personal popularity for Mayor Young resulted in no major opponents stepping forward.  The lack of credible opposition resulted in low turnout for the election.

Results

References

Atlanta
1985
Atlanta, Georgia